The Kolopis River is one of the major rivers that flows through Kinabalu National Park in Sabah, Malaysia. An area adjacent to the upper Kolopis River is home to a number of pitcher plants of the genus Nepenthes, including N. edwardsiana, N. rajah, and N. villosa, as well as two natural hybrids involving these species (N. × harryana and N. × kinabaluensis).

References

Mount Kinabalu
Rivers of Sabah
Rivers of Malaysia